The Sacred Heart is a Catholic devotion to the heart of Jesus Christ as a symbol of divine love and the source of the sacraments of the church.

Sacred Heart may also refer to:

  Sacred Heart of Mary, the heart of Mary, mother of Jesus, as a subject of Catholic devotion.

Churches and cathedrals 
 Sacred Heart Cathedral (disambiguation)
 Sacred Heart Church (disambiguation)
 Basilica of the Sacred Heart of Jesus (Atlanta), Atlanta, Georgia

Communities 
In the United States:
 Sacred Heart, Minnesota
 Sacred Heart Township, Renville County, Minnesota
 Sacred Heart, Oklahoma

Congregations and orders

Male
 Brothers of the Sacred Heart
 Congregation of the Sacred Hearts of Jesus and Mary, also called the Picpus fathers and sisters
 Dehonians, formally called Priests of the Sacred Heart of Jesus
 Missionaries of the Sacred Heart
 Society of Saint Joseph of the Sacred Heart (Josephites)

Female
 Sisters of St Joseph of the Sacred Heart
 Society of the Sacred Heart
 Sisters of the Sacred Hearts of Jesus and Mary
 Handmaids of the Sacred Heart of Jesus
 Oblates of the Heart of Jesus (1874), Louise-Thérèse de Montaignac de Chauvance
 Religious of the Sacred Heart of Mary

Medical institutions 
 Sacred Heart Medical Center (disambiguation)
 Sacred Heart Hospital (disambiguation)

Music and film 
 The English name of the 2005 Italian language film Cuore Sacro
 Sacred Heart (Dio album)
 Sacred Heart (Peter Ostroushko album)
 Sacred Heart (Shakespears Sister album)
 "Sacred Heart", B-side of the 1981 Orchestral Manoeuvres in the Dark single "Souvenir"
"Sacred Heart", original soundtrack of Ave Maryam

Schools 
Sacred Heart Language College, London, England
 Sacred Heart Academy (disambiguation)
 Sacred Heart College (disambiguation)
 College of the Sacred Heart (disambiguation)
 Sacred Heart High School (disambiguation)
 Sacred Heart school (disambiguation)
 Convent of the Sacred Heart (disambiguation)
 Sacred Heart University, Fairfield, Connecticut
 Sacred Heart Apostolic School, Rolling Prairie, Indiana

Fine Arts 
 Sacred Heart of Jesus (Batoni), a 1767 painting of the Sacred Heart by Pompeo Batoni

See also 
 Feast of the Sacred Heart, a solemnity of the Roman Catholic church
 Our Lady of the Sacred Heart (disambiguation)
 Sacré Cœur (disambiguation), French for Sacred Heart
 Sacro Cuore (disambiguation), Italian for Sacred Heart